List of governors of Hispania Tarraconensis, also known as Hispania Citerior. This imperial province was created from Hispania Ulterior in 27 BC, and existed until AD 293 when Diocletian divided it into 3 smaller provinces.

References 

 
Hispania Tarraconensis
Hispania Tarraconensis